This article lists the winners and nominees for the Billboard Music Award for Top Hot 100 Song. Since the creation of this category in 1990, Justin Bieber is the first and only artist to win this award multiple times (2).

Winners and nominees
Winners are listed first and highlighted in bold.

1990s

2000s

2010s

2020s

Multiple awards and nominations

Wins
2 wins
 Justin Bieber

Nominations

4 nominations
 Maroon 5
 The Weeknd

3 nominations
 Boyz II Men
 Katy Perry

2 nominations
 Adele
 Alicia Keys
 Mariah Carey
 The Chainsmokers
 Celine Dion
 Nelly
 Charlie Puth
 Santana
 TLC
 Usher
 Wiz Khalifa
 Cardi B
 Justin Bieber

References

Billboard awards